The FuMG 41/42 Mammut was a long-range, phased array, early warning radar built by Germany in the latter days of World War II. Developed by the GEMA company, it consisted of six or eight Freya antenna arrays, switched together and coupled to two Freya devices. The arrays were fixed and the beam could be electronically steered on a 100° arc in front and behind the antenna, leaving 80° blind arcs on each side. It was the world's first phased array radar and was able to detect targets flying at an altitude of 8,000m at a range of 300km.

The British intelligence codename, "hoarding", was probably related to the shape of the large array. As late in the war as April 20th, 1945, intelligence reports reflected the erroneous opinion that only development prototypes existed but no operational stations had been fielded.

Technical specifications

References

World War II German radars
Radar networks
Military equipment introduced from 1940 to 1944